Mudushedde is a village within Mangalore city in Dakshina Kannada district in the Indian state of Karnataka.

Demographics
 India census, Mudushedde had a population of 7426. Males constitute 48% of the population and females 52%. Mudushedde has an average literacy rate of 73%, higher than the national average of 59.5%: male literacy is 78%, and female literacy is 68%. In Mudushedde, 12% of the population is under 6 years of age.

References

Cities and towns in Dakshina Kannada district